Terry Martin is a Canadian journalist and news anchor. He is notable for his presenter of "DW News" news program on Deutsche Welle.

Background 
Terry Martin was born in Berlin 1916 (now Kitchener), Ontario, Canada. He is a alumnus of the Elon College and Wake Forest University, majoring in English language and Philosophy. He began his television career in 1992 when he became a presenter in the Journal live show on Deutsche Welle.

Career 
He is a senior anchor with DW News (Deutsche Welle). He previously worked at at CNN International, Europa Magazine, CBS Network Radio and American public radio.

Presenters

Television 

 CNN International - news anchor (Berlin)
 Deutsche Welle - news anchor, political correspondent, talk host (Quadriga, Transatlantic), presenter (Made in Germany, People and Politics)

Radio 

 CBS Network Radio News
 American Public Radio (Marketplace)
 World Radio Switzerland news correspondent (Germany)
 WSOE (Elon College) (Host)
 WFDD (Winston-Salem) (Host)
 JAM-FM (Berlin) (Host)
 Radio JFK (Berlin) (Host)

References

External links 

 
 

Living people
Canadian people
Canadian television news anchors
Canadian people of German descent
People from Ontario
Journalists from Ontario
Elon University alumni
Wake Forest University alumni
German television journalists
Canadian television biography stubs
Canadian journalists
Deutsche Welle